The minister of Sport is a Government of Canada cabinet minister responsible for Sport Canada (and sports in Canada, more generally), who typically assists the minister of Canadian Heritage.

The specific name of the ministerial designation has changed many times since the position was introduced in 1961, typically depending on the portfolio it falls under. It was originally known as the Minister of Amateur Sport, answering to the Minister of National Health and Welfare. The position was then relegated to the Secretary of State in 1976, with various titles, only to return as a full cabinet position in 2015. That year, the title was changed to Minister of Sport and Persons with Disabilities following the appointment of Carla Qualtrough and the addition of the responsibility toward disability in Canada to the portfolio. In 2018, shortly after Kirsty Duncan assumed the role, the name was changed to the Minister of Science and Sport.

After the 2019 federal election, Prime Minister Justin Trudeau did not appoint a Minister for Sport, passing on this responsibility to the Minister of Canadian Heritage, Steven Guilbeault at the time. After the 2021 federal election, the position was once again spun out, and Pascale St-Onge was appointed to the office.

Ministers

References

Disability in Canada
Sports in Canada
Sport, Minister for
Canada, Minister for Sport